Cleo Smith, a four-year-old Australian girl, disappeared on 16 October 2021 from a campsite in the Gascoyne region of Western Australia (WA). Police allege that she was abducted by a 36-year-old man from Carnarvon. She was found alive and well on 3 November, after the man's home was raided by police. Her safe recovery after eighteen days was described as extremely rare, and received widespread news coverage and social media reaction both across Australia and internationally.

Disappearance
At the time of the incident, four-year-old Cleo Smith lived with her mother Ellie Smith, stepfather Jake Gliddon and her sister, in Carnarvon, Western Australia. At approximately 6:30p.m. on 15 October 2021, the family arrived at the Blowholes campsite in Macleod, around 80 km north of Carnarvon, for a weekend visit.

In an interview after Cleo's disappearance, Ellie said that the girl had gone to bed in the family's tent at around 8p.m., woke up early the next morning at 1:30a.m. asking for water, and had returned to sleep after being given water. When the family woke at 6a.m. on 16 October, they discovered both Cleo and her sleeping bag missing. The tent that the family was sleeping in was opened to a length of about 30 cm from its fully-open position.

Search
The family briefly searched the area for Cleo, and informed police at 6:23a.m. after they realised she was not in the vicinity of the campsite. A police car was dispatched seven minutes after the phone call, and arrived at the campsite at 7:10a.m. Police conducted an air, land and sea search around the area for most of the day. Ellie stated that Cleo had not left by herself, saying on 19 October that "she would never leave us, she would never leave the tent".

On 20 October, Acting Deputy Commissioner Daryl Gaunt of the Western Australia Police Force said that claims that the case was being treated as an abduction were not correct, explaining that the case was being treated primarily as a search and rescue case. Inspector Jon Munday said on the same day that the zip on Cleo's tent was open higher than she could have reached, stating the positioning of the zipper was a primary factor that had given rise to concerns about Cleo's safety.

It was announced on 21 October that the police believed that Cleo had been abducted, with WA Premier Mark McGowan announcing a A$1 million reward for anyone with information on her disappearance. Various Australian media organisations reported that this reward attracted bounty hunters to Carnarvon to search for Cleo.

Taskforce Rodia was launched by the Western Australian Police Force with assistance from the Australian Federal Police, involving more than 100 police officers led by Superintendent Rod Wilde.

While police did not rule out the possibility that Cleo could have been taken out of WA to another state, Police Commissioner Chris Dawson noted that strict border controls that had been put in place in WA and other states, due to the COVID-19 pandemic would make undetected travel out of the state difficult.

Discovery
On 3 November 2021, Cleo was found by police, alive and well, inside a locked house located minutes from her family home in Carnarvon. A 36-year-old man was subsequently taken into custody after a car he was driving was stopped by police. Cleo was reunited with her family the same day. Deputy Commissioner Col Blanch said police had broken into the house at 12:46a.m. and found Cleo in one of the rooms. Police Commissioner Dawson called the day of her discovery "one of the most remarkable days in policing in Western Australia", and explained that forensic leads had led them to obtain a search warrant for the house. The man who was taken into custody had no connection to Cleo's family, but is known to police.

The man suspected of the crime was described by his neighbours as very quiet and an oddball but had not been under suspicion by them. He had fallen under police suspicion the day before his arrest. His alleged crime was described by police superintendent Rod Wilde as opportunistic.

The discovery was attributed by the police to a key clue of a car spotted driving from the campsite in the early hours of 16 October, with the police having made a public plea for further information about it on 25 October. According to Blanch, police work utilising a large amount of information in the case was essential.

Reactions
Cleo's return was met with widespread joy and relief around Australia. Dawson was said to have broken down in tears upon hearing the news. The successful recovery also attracted media interest around the world.

According to Xanthé Mallett, associate professor of criminology at the University of Newcastle, it was extremely rare to find a child safe after such a lengthy time missing, and the case did not fit the pattern of the majority of child abduction cases.

In the aftermath of Cleo's discovery, both ABC News and The Guardian published articles contrasting her case with the coverage and investigation of missing Indigenous Australian children.

After being reunited with her daughter at the Carnarvon hospital, Cleo's mother noticed that her hair had been cut and dyed.

Criminal proceedings
On 4 November 2021, police charged 36-year-old Carnarvon resident Terence Darrell Kelly with two offences including one count of forcibly taking a child under 16. He appeared before the Carnarvon Magistrates Court and did not apply for bail. The matter returned to court on 6 December 2021.  Kelly was flown to Perth on 5 November 2021 and was transferred to Casuarina Prison. Kelly appeared via video link and pleaded guilty to one count of child stealing, but did not enter a plea on a charge of assaulting a public officer.

Misidentification of suspect
On 3 November, media outlet Seven News named the wrong person as Cleo's alleged abductor, retracting and apologising later that day. According to NITV News, that person intends to sue Seven News, claiming that their misidentification required him to undergo medical treatment following a severe panic attack.

Additional charges
In January 2022, it was revealed that Kelly will face additional charges for assaulting a police officer.

See also
List of solved missing person cases

References

2020s missing person cases
2020s in Western Australia
Formerly missing people
Missing person cases in Australia
November 2021 events in Australia
October 2021 events in Australia
People from Carnarvon, Western Australia